Orosi High School is a public high school in Orosi, California, in the Cutler-Orosi Joint Unified School District.

History 
The Orosi High School District was organized in 1909 by Frances E. Snell. Grammar and high school classes were held in the same building, with high school occupying the upstairs portion and one downstairs room. The first class was made up of twenty-nine freshmen, two sophomores, and one junior. Frances Snell taught mathematics, history, and English while Louise Duncan was in charge of the commercial department and Latin. By 1911, the high school was distinct from the grammar school, but remained in the same building.

In 1912, Orosi High School's first class graduated. Two students made up the graduating class. That same year, a new site for the school was purchased on Road 128 (formerly Palm Avenue). Temporary buildings were put up to accommodate the students.

The main structure was of the old California style with boards running up and down. The front of the building was an assembly room with an office adjoining and four classrooms toward the back. Small utility buildings were in the back. One of these had a loft which was a great attraction for the boys.

In the 1914–1915 academic year, the school welcomed 15 new students and graduated 7 seniors.

In 1917 a combination brick and stucco schoolhouse was built with seven classrooms, assembly hall, administrative office and faculty room. A brick gymnasium of brick and a frame shop building were added in 1922. The homemaking department had a wing to itself. A south wing was added in 1937, and remains after other old buildings burned or were demolished to be replaced by new ones in 1956. The school suffered a destructive fire in 1942. Bonds and state support provided funds for new classrooms and a new gymnasium, which was ready in 1951. The other new buildings were occupied in 1954. In 1955 the administration of both the elementary and high schools was placed under one superintendent, each retaining its own principal.

In 1962, a new building was built, which housed a library, science laboratory, and additional classrooms.

In 1965, the district unified and the high school students from Badger were included in the district.

A football stadium was built for the school in 1972.

In 1990, Orosi High School was awarded the California Distinguished School recognition.

In 2007, Cutler-Orosi was one of the communities to receive the U.S. Department of Justice "weed and seed" grants and in 2010, it underwent a remodeling, which included adding new classrooms and an amphitheater and redesigning the student quad area.

The Class of 2012 was Orosi High school's 100th graduating class. The last of the graduating classes to begin their formal education in the 20th century. The class is considered a "turning point" in the educational history for OHS and saw they highest number of students going into higher education and the UC system. The graduating class consisted of eight valedictorians.

In 2015 was named a Gold Ribbon School by the California Department of Education.

In 2017 a new science building was added to the school featuring 8 new classrooms and new restrooms.

In 2018 the Orosi High School will receive a new stadium which is planned to start on March 1, 2018 and will be complete by October 2018. The stadium will have new bleachers seating 3,200 people more than the old one. There will also be a nine-synthetic track around the field. It will also include a new bathroom and concession stand on the visitor's side.

Education and community 
Orosi High School has faced struggles as a small school in an unincorporated community. Its student population is largely low-income, many of whom deal with poverty and do not expect to pursue higher education. With youth-focused efforts from the school and community, Orosi has sought to decrease gang violence and juvenile crime through providing a stronger foundation for the betterment of education and social services. Without an incorporated city department, the school district takes a leadership role in a lot of initiatives in the community, using OHS as a central location. In 2007, Cutler-Orosi was one of the communities to receive the U.S. Department of Justice "weed and seed" grants which enabled funds to be put towards anti-gang programs, graffiti abatement, the opening of "safe haven" after-school sites by the Cutler-Orosi Joint Unified School District.

After the 2010 remodeling, spare trailers formerly used as classrooms were available to be used as a StepUp program location after receiving a service learning grant in 2011. It has since been able to provide many more alternative activities for students after-school.

With the addition of an AVID program, and grassroots support from parents and community, OHS has turned its focus on college preparation and developing working skills in its students. OHS has consistently been a National Demonstration School for AVID.

The Academy of Engineering and Green Technology was added in 2013 and the Academy of Health Sciences in 2014. Future projects hope for the addition of a third academy: the Academy of Sustainable Agriculture.

Orosi High School's campus is also a site for College of Sequoias course programs.

Extracurricular
Orosi High School has an AVID (Advancement Via Individual Determination) program to prepare students for college and assist them in the application process. The Cardinal Band is a marching band and also plays at home football games. The school is also involved with the United States Academic Decathlon and Tulare County Mock Trial. In 2012, a JV baseball team was established, which is still in existence. The Boys Varsity Soccer Team were Valley Champions in 2013. For the first time in Orosi High School history, the Varsity Team won back to back Valley Champions in 2014. Orosi High School also has a Mariachi team called "Los Cardinales." They have competed in 12 competitions taking 1st six times, 2nd 5 times, and 3rd only once.  In 2015 Frankie Manquero was made head coach for Orosi High school football team. Also, in 2016 the boys varsity basketball team captured its first East Sierra League title while being in the league. After a slow start of 0-2 they turned the league into there show and went 12-2 winning 10 straight. They ended up making the playoffs and entering its first state playoff berth in school history.
In 2016 The Orosi Cardinal marching band under the direction of new Band instructor Johnathan Gaspar took Grand Sweepstakes at The 3rd annual Orange Cove band Review. In 2017 Benjamin White was made new head coach for the Orosi High School Varsity football program and led them into the semifinals against Strathmore, this was the first time in 12 years that Orosi has made it into the semifinals and having an 8–4 record. White also gave Orosi an East Sierra League championship and winning back the “O” against school rival Orange Cove in the Battle of the O. The JV football team also had an amazing year going 8–2.

References 

High schools in Tulare County, California
Public high schools in California
1909 establishments in California